Ling Huanxin (born March 1962) is a lieutenant general in the People's Liberation Army of China.

He is a representative of the 20th National Congress of the Chinese Communist Party and an alternate member of the 20th Central Committee of the Chinese Communist Party. He is a delegate to the 13th National People's Congress.

Biography
Ling was born in Jingjiang County (now Jingjiang), Jiangsu, in March 1962. He was deputy head of the Organization Division of the People's Liberation Army General Political Department before being appointed Director of the Political Department of the Northern Theater Command Ground Force in January 2017. In March 2017, he became a member of the Commission for Discipline Inspection of the Central Military Commission, and was elevated to deputy secretary in December 2018.

He attained the rank of major general (shaojiang) in December 2019.

References

1962 births
Living people
People from Jingjiang
People's Liberation Army generals from Jiangsu
People's Republic of China politicians from Jiangsu
Chinese Communist Party politicians from Jiangsu
Alternate members of the 20th Central Committee of the Chinese Communist Party
Delegates to the 13th National People's Congress